Umling Gewog (Dzongkha: ཨུམ་གླིང་) is a gewog (village block) of Sarpang District, Bhutan.

Umling Gewog is situated in the central Southern foothills of Sarpang Dzongkhag, bordering Assam, India, in the
South, and Chuzagang Gewog in the West, Tareythang Gewog in the East and Zhemgang Dzongkhag in the North.

It has warm and humid climatic condition in winter and hot and rainy climatic conditions in summer.

It has a total population of 3129 with almost 100 percent of the people dependent upon agriculture.

Arecanut and ginger are grown as principal cash crop while paddy and maize are cultivated as main crop by the farmers. Beside farmers also rear domestic animals like cows, oxen, goats, sheep, etc. which ultimately add to their livelihood.

Until 2011 local government election, the Gewog had eight Chiwogs, namely: Chhuborthang, Daangling, Doongmin, Gaden, Lingar, Rijoog, Tashithang and Thongjazor and was merged into five Chiwogs, namely: Daangling, Doongmin, Gaden, Rijoog and Tashithang after the first LG election. The Geog is administratively headed by Gelephu Dungkhag and subsequently by Sarpang Dzongkhag.

References

 
Sarpang District